Želimir "Željko" Stinčić (born 13 July 1950 in Zagreb) is a Croatian retired footballer.

Club career
Stinčić, son of Yugoslav international Branko Stinčić, started playing at NK Dinamo Zagreb in 1967, but had only a handful of appearances in his first six seasons with the club, acting as a second- or third-choice goalkeeper at the time when established goalkeepers Zlatko Škorić and Fahrija Dautbegović were at the club. Following Dautbegović's departure, Stinčić appeared in 21 Yugoslav First League matches in the 1973–74 season, and became a regular member of the first team squad in the following years. By 1981 he played a total of 478 games (including 190 league matches) for the Blues. At the end of the 1980–81 season he moved abroad to Austrian side SV Austria Salzburg, where he played for four seasons, appearing in 91 Austrian Bundesliga games, before retiring in 1985.

International career
He was capped once for Yugoslavia, in a Euro 1980 qualifier against Spain on 4 October 1978 and conceded two goals from Juanito and Santillana in a 2–1 defeat.

After retiring he worked as a goalkeeping coach at Dinamo Zagreb until 2005, when he opened a goalkeeping academy together with Zlatko Škorić.
Zlatko unfortunately got diabetes and since his finger has got cut off (because of diabetes) he wasn't able to work.
After that incident Stincic was working alone.

References

External links
 

1950 births
Living people
Footballers from Zagreb
Association football goalkeepers
Yugoslav footballers
Yugoslavia international footballers
GNK Dinamo Zagreb players
FC Red Bull Salzburg players
Yugoslav First League players
Austrian Football Bundesliga players
Yugoslav expatriate footballers
Expatriate footballers in Austria
Yugoslav expatriate sportspeople in Austria